The Whakataki River is a river of Wellington region of New Zealand's North Island.  It flows generally south before turning east to reach the Pacific Ocean five kilometres north of Castlepoint.

See also 
 List of rivers of New Zealand

References 

Rivers of the Wellington Region
Rivers of New Zealand